Tracey Lee Belbin OAM (born 24 June 1967 in Cairns, Queensland) is a former field hockey player from Australia, who represented her native country at two consecutive Summer Olympics, starting in 1988 in Seoul, South Korea. There she won the gold medal with the Women's National Team.

As a student of the University of Queensland in Brisbane she graduated in 1993, getting a double major in psychology. After her active career she became a hockey coach, working as an assistant for the South African Women's Team. In January 1999 Belbin was named Head Coach of the US Women's Team, with whom she won the silver medal at the 1999 Pan American Games. She resigned after the 2002 Women's Hockey World Cup.

In 2009 Belbin was inducted into the Queensland Sport Hall of Fame.

References

 Profile on US Field Hockey

External links
 

1967 births
Living people
Australian female field hockey players
Australian field hockey coaches
Field hockey players at the 1988 Summer Olympics
Field hockey players at the 1992 Summer Olympics
Olympic field hockey players of Australia
Olympic gold medalists for Australia
People from Queensland
Recipients of the Medal of the Order of Australia
Olympic medalists in field hockey
Medalists at the 1988 Summer Olympics
20th-century Australian women